The Great Lakes Trek or Kashmir Great Lakes Trek commercially known as Sonamarg-Vishansar-Naranag Trek is an alpine himalayan high-altitude trek in the Kashmir Valley in the Indian state of Jammu and Kashmir. This is the most famous trek in Kashmir. The trek is usually completed in 6-7 days and is rated as moderate-difficult in terms of terrain and trail difficulty. The trek is an absolute treat and worth every effort as one gets to see new alpine lakes, mountain peaks, passes, meadows and glaciers almost every subsequent day.

Itinerary 
The trek can be started from both, Sonamarg and Naranag but is generally considered to be easier if started from Sonamarg. If started from sonmargh, one does a base camp at a place called table top or 'Shaukdari'. Its a 6-7 hours trek from the point where the car leaves you and a good spot for a base camp as its inhabited by the local Gujjar-Bakarwal population and there is plenty of firewood available. 

The second day is a long trek to the twin lakes of Vishansar-Kishansar via the Nichnai pass. There is a possibility of finding mobile network reception at the pass on bsnl network.

References

Geography of Jammu and Kashmir
Hiking trails in India
Tourism in Jammu and Kashmir